Heather Veitch (born on March 7, 1974) is an American Christian missionary who worked previously as a stripper but now seeks to help women working in strip clubs leave the adult entertainment industry. She is the founder of the Christian ministry JC's Girls, based out of Las Vegas, Nevada.

Veitch is a frequent speaker, working with both secular and religious audiences throughout the United States. Her expertise and knowledge in reaching out to women working in strip clubs has been utilized throughout the world by organizations seeking to develop like-minded ministries.

JC's Girls 

JC's Girls is an international, faith-based organization that offers spiritual support to women working in the sex industry. Their primary focus includes visiting local strip clubs in order to extend an invitation to attend church. Their approach includes offering small gift packages along with ministry contact information. Additionally, the ministry participates in the annual AVN Adult Entertainment Expo held in Las Vegas. The organization has set up an exhibitor booth during the convention, presenting a message to entertainers and patrons with the message: "There is nothing you have ever done that God would not forgive you for!"

The organization has developed chapter ministries across the United States. These chapters include JCs Girls of San Diego; JCs Girls of Austin, Texas; JCs Girls of Las Vegas; and JCs Girls of Sioux Falls, South Dakota.

In 2007, Veitch began partnering with Annie Lobert of "Hookers for Jesus" on a joint media project entitled "Saving Sex City".

Pussycat Preacher documentary
In 2007, Veitch's life and ministry were presented in a documentary. Directed by documentary filmmaker Bill Day, the film revealed the inside story of Veitch's life and her struggle to start a ministry for women in the sex industry. The film primarily focuses on Veitch, along with the team of Christian women who join her to become JC's Girls, and Pastor Matt Brown of Sandals Church in Riverside, California. The film highlights the pastor's efforts to support Veitch's endeavor, while facing opposition from his local congregation.

Private life 
Veitch was born in Los Angeles but grew up in Muscoy, San Bernardino County.

References

External links

 
 JC's Girls Ministry Website
 The Pussycat Preacher
 A Second Life After Sin
 Ex-Stripper Spreads Gospel to Those in Sex Industry
 Now they bare their souls to minister to others
 
 Pussycat Preacher YouTube channel

1970s births
American female erotic dancers
American erotic dancers
American Protestant missionaries
Female Christian missionaries
Living people
Sex worker activists in the United States
Converts to Protestantism
21st-century American women